"Electric Kiss" is a song by South Korean–Chinese boy band Exo, released on January 31, 2018, as the lead single of their first Japanese album Countdown.

Release and composition 
Tamar Hermann from Billboard described "Electric Kiss" as a song with "thumping beats and funky synths [that] propel the single's melody, laying out a tempo-jumping playground for Exo's vocals and raps as the track builds into its propulsive chorus". The song was released on January 31 with the album.

Music video 
A short version of the "Electric Kiss" music video was released on December 5, 2017 by S.M. Entertainment. The accompanying dance practice video was released on January 12, 2018. It features Exo trapped in mirrored rooms and glass tanks, sitting on piles of discarded objects or roaming empty buildings.

The music video was broadcast on the big screen of Yunika Vision at Seibu Shinjuku Station from January 29 until February 4, 2018.

Promotion 
Exo performed "Electric Kiss" for the first time on January 26, 2018 on the Japanese morning TV show Sukkiri. On January 27 and 28, Exo performed "Electric Kiss" during their tour Exo Planet #4 – The ElyXion in Saitama.

Charts

Release history

References

Songs about kissing
Exo songs
2018 songs
2018 singles